Dromochorus pilatei, the Cajun Dromo tiger beetle, is a species of tiger beetle in the family Cicindelidae. It is found in Texas and Louisiana.

References

Further reading

 

Cicindelidae
Articles created by Qbugbot
Beetles described in 1849